Soul Survivor is the 21st studio album by Al Green, released in 1987.

Track listing
"Everything's Gonna be Alright" (Eban Kelly, Jimi Randolph) - 4:21
"Jesus Will Fix It" (Al Green)  - 3:24
"You Know and I Know" (Green, Paul Zaleski) - 4:01
"Yield Not to Temptation" (Traditional) - 3:35
"So Real to Me" (Green) - 0:54
"Soul Survivor" (Kelly, Randolph) - 4:43
"You've Got a Friend" (Carole King) - 5:37 (duet with Billy Preston) 
"He Ain't Heavy" (Sidney Russell, Bobby Scott) - 4:03
"23rd Psalm" (Green) - 3:46

Personnel 
 Al Green – lead vocals, backing vocals (2, 3, 6), acoustic guitar (2, 4, 5, 9), arrangements (2-5, 8, 9)
 Jimi Randolph – all other instruments (1), arrangements (1, 6), all instruments (6)
 P. Leon Thomas – keyboards (1)
 Debra Carter – organ (4, 9)
 Louis Paul – synthesizers (5)
 Jonathan Cobert – synthesizers (7)
 Billy Preston – Hammond B3 organ (7), lead vocals (7)
 Jerry Peters – keyboards (8)
 Michael Toles – electric guitar (2, 5), organ (5)
 Bobby Manuel – guitars (8)
 Paul Zaleski – bass (2), percussion (2, 3), keyboards (3)
 Francisco Centeno – bass (7)
 Willie Hall – drums (2-5, 9), percussion (5)
 Jeff Vilinsky – drums (7), arrangements (7)
 Steve Mergen – drums (8)
 Errol Thomas – arrangements (3, 8), bass (4, 8, 9)
 Deborah McDuffie – arrangements (7)
 Andrew Love – saxophone (8)
 Berkley Buckles – backing vocals (1)
 Eban Kelly – backing vocals (1, 6), arrangements (1, 6)
 Full Gospel Tabernacle Choir – backing vocals (4, 9)
 Andrea Blackwood – backing vocals (5)
 Donna Blackwood – backing vocals (5)
 Jeanie Hamilton – backing vocals (5)
 Michael Brown – backing vocals (7)
 Dennis Collins – backing vocals (7)
 Curtis King – backing vocals (7)
 Patrice Taylor – backing vocals (8)

Production 
 Producers – Eban Kelly and Jimi Randolph (Tracks 1 & 6); Errol Thomas and Paul Zaleski (Tracks 2-5, 8 & 9); Deborah McDuffie (Track 7).
 Executive Producer – Al Green 
 Engineers – Jimi Randolph (Tracks 1 & 6); Al Green, Errol Thomas and Paul Zaleski (Tracks 2-5, 7, 8 & 9).
 Assistant Engineers – Eban Kelly (Tracks 1 & 6); Ron Dickerson, Tom Luani and Pat Taylor (Tracks 2-5, 7, 8 & 9).
 Recorded at Al Green Music Recording Studio and Ardent Studios (Memphis, TN); Startec (Washington D.C. ); Mayfair Recording Studios (New York, NY).
 Mixed at Al Green Music Recording Studio; Ardent Studios; Mayfair Recording Studios; Mission Control Studios (Boston, MA).
 Mastered by Brian Gardner at Bernie Grundman Mastering (Hollywood, CA).
 Art Direction – Chuck Beeson
 Design – Donald Krieger
 Photography – Peter Nash

References 

Al Green albums
1987 albums